Fahri is the Turkish spelling of the Arabic name Fakhri, (Arabic: فَخْري fakh·riy, fakh·rī, fakh·ry) in the possessive form meaning "honorary, titulary", both used as a name or surname. 

It may refer to:

Given name
 Fahri Asiza, Indonesian novelist and teacher
 Fahri Beqiri (born 1936), Albanian composer and music professor
 Fahri Hamzah (born 1971), Indonesian politician and former deputy speaker of the Indonesia House of Representatives
 Fahri Kasırga (born 1953), Turkish lawyer and Secretary General of the Presidency of Turkey
 Fahri Korutürk (1903–1987), Turkish navy officer, diplomat and the sixth President of Turkey
 Fahri Sümer (born 1958), Turkish boxer
 Fahri Tatan (born 1983), Turkish footballer
 Fahri Yardım (born 1980), German actor

Middle name
Mahdi Fahri Albaar (born 1995), Indonesian footballer

Surname
Hussein Fahri Pasha (1843–1910), prime minister of Egypt 
Jake Fahri, murderer of Jimmy Mizen

See also
Fakhri / Fakhry, Arabic form of the name
 Farhi

Arabic-language surnames
Arabic masculine given names
Turkish-language surnames
Turkish masculine given names